Gallipienzo (Basque: Galipentzu) is a town and municipality located in the province and autonomous community of Navarre, northern Spain.
. The village was used as a location in the Terry Gilliam movie 'The Man Who Killed Don Quixote'.

References

External links
 GALLIPIENZO in the Bernardo Estornés Lasa - Auñamendi Encyclopedia (Euskomedia Fundazioa) 

Municipalities in Navarre